Fujiki (written:  lit. "Japanese wisteria tree") is a Japanese surname. Notable people with the surname include:

, Japanese synchronized swimmer and coach
, Japanese actor and singer
, Japanese cross-country skier
, Japanese golfer
, Japanese actor and voice actor
, Japanese actor

See also
Fujiki class C, a complex manifold

Japanese-language surnames